Antoine Conte (born 29 January 1994) is a professional footballer who plays as a right-back for Israeli club Hapoel Tel Aviv. Born in France, he plays for the Guinea national team.

Club career
Conte made his debut in the Ligue 1 on 1 February 2013 against Toulouse replacing Mamadou Sakho after 76 minutes.

On 31 January 2017, Conte joined Beitar Jerusalem on loan until the end of the season with an option given to Beitar Jerusalem to sign him permanently.

On 15 June 2017, signed permanently with Beitar agreeing to a three-year contract.

In February 2021, after being sentenced to a one-year prison sentence by the court in France, Beitar released Conte.

International career
Born in France, Conte is of Guinean descent. He has represented France at numerous youth levels all the way up to under-21 level. He debuted with the Guinea national team in a friendly 0–0 tie with South Africa on 25 March 2022.

Personal life
On 8 December 2016, Conte was held by French Police for assaulting his girlfriend and attacking a 19-year-old man, who tried to help, with a baseball bat, inflicting leg, arm and head injuries, including a brain haemorrhage. In January 2021, he was sentenced to three years of prison. In May he filed an appeal for the reduction of his sentence.

Honours
Paris Saint-Germain
 Ligue 1: 2012–13

Beitar Jerusalem
Toto Cup: 2019–20

Universitatea Craiova
Supercupa României: 2021

France U19
UEFA European Under-19 Championship runner-up: 2013
France U21
Toulon Tournament runner-up: 2014

Individual
UEFA European Under-19 Championship Team of the Tournament: 2013

References

External links
 
 
 

1994 births
Living people
Footballers from Paris
Guinean footballers
Guinea international footballers
French footballers
France under-21 international footballers
France youth international footballers
French sportspeople of Guinean descent
Association football defenders
Paris Saint-Germain F.C. players
Stade de Reims players
Beitar Jerusalem F.C. players
CS Universitatea Craiova players
Hapoel Tel Aviv F.C. players
Ligue 1 players
Ligue 2 players
Israeli Premier League players
Liga I players
Guinean expatriate footballers
French expatriate footballers
Expatriate footballers in Israel
Expatriate footballers in Romania
French expatriate sportspeople in Israel
French expatriate sportspeople in Romania
Guinean expatriate sportspeople in Israel
Guinean expatriate sportspeople in Romania
Black French sportspeople